Guliston is a district of Sirdaryo Region in Uzbekistan. The capital lies at the town Dehqonobod. The district consists of 5 urban-type settlements (Dehqonobod, Hulkar, Beshbuloq, Ulugʻbek, Xalqakoʻl) and 9 rural communities.

References

Districts of Uzbekistan
Sirdaryo Region